Wellington North is a township in the Canadian province of Ontario, located within Wellington County.

Communities
The primary communities in Wellington North are the village of Arthur and the town of Mount Forest.

The township also contains the smaller communities of  Damascus, Derrynane, Farewell, Gordonville, Green Park, Kenilworth, Metz, Monck, Mount View, Olivet, Petherton, Riverstown and Wagram.

History
On January 1, 1999, the township was formed through the amalgamation of the townships of Arthur and West Luther, the village of Arthur and the town of Mount Forest, and a small portion of the West Garafraxa Township.

The newly amalgamated township was named Wellington North on April 17, 1999.

Demographics 

Education
Wellington North is served by five elementary schools and one secondary school, under jurisdiction of two school boards, the public board being Upper Grand District School Board, and the Catholic board being Wellington Catholic District School Board, both of which are based in Guelph. Elementary schools include:
 Arthur Public School
 Kenilworth Public School
 St. John Catholic School (Arthur)
 St. Mary Catholic School (Mount Forest)
 Victoria Cross Public School (Mount Forest)

Wellington Heights Secondary School in Mount Forest is the only high school in the township, and is part of the public school board.  Catholic students must go to Guelph for Catholic secondary education, at Saint James Catholic High School.

Media
Wellington North is served by several local newspapers:
Arthur Enterprise News
Mount Forest Confederate
Wellington Advertiser

Symbols
The township logo was designed by Reg Mason. The tree represents forested areas; the brickwork and shield represent the foundation for the new era; and within the shield is a buggy representing the Mennonite people. The church stands for freedom of religious choice, and the great blue heron represents the phantom of the marsh. The large toothed wheel stands for industry, and the grain sheaths represent the agriculture of the area. The motto, Semper Porro, is Latin for "Forever Forward".

See also
List of townships in Ontario

References

External links

Township municipalities in Ontario
Lower-tier municipalities in Ontario
Municipalities in Wellington County, Ontario